The Women's Cathay Pacific Hong Kong Open 2016 is the women's edition of the 2016 Hong Kong Open, which is a PSA World Series event (prize money: 115 000 $). The event took place in Hong Kong from 23 August to 28 August. Nouran Gohar won her first Hong Kong Open trophy, beating Amanda Sobhy in the final.

Prize money and ranking points
For 2016, the prize purse was $115,000. The prize money and points breakdown is as follows:

Seeds

Draw and results

See also
Hong Kong Open (squash)
Men's Hong Kong squash Open 2016
2016–17 PSA World Series

References

Squash tournaments in Hong Kong
Women's Hong Kong Open (squash)
Women's Hong Kong Open (squash)
2016 in women's squash